In quantum field theory, the Nambu–Jona-Lasinio model (or more precisely: the Nambu and Jona-Lasinio model) is a complicated effective theory of nucleons and mesons constructed from interacting Dirac fermions with chiral symmetry, paralleling the construction of Cooper pairs from electrons in the BCS theory of superconductivity. The "complicatedness" of the theory has become more natural as it is now seen as a low-energy approximation of the still more basic theory of quantum chromodynamics, which does not work perturbatively at low energies.

Overview
The model is much inspired by  the different field of solid state theory, particularly from the BCS breakthrough of 1957. The first inventor of the Nambu–Jona-Lasinio model, Yoichiro Nambu, also contributed essentially to the theory of superconductivity, i.e., by the "Nambu formalism". The second inventor was Giovanni Jona-Lasinio. The common paper of the authors that introduced the model appeared in 1961. A subsequent paper included chiral symmetry breaking, isospin and strangeness.
At the same time, the same model was independently considered by Soviet physicists Valentin Vaks and Anatoly Larkin.

The model is quite technical, although based essentially on symmetry principles. It is an example of the importance of four-fermion interactions and is defined in a spacetime with an even number of dimensions. It is still important and is used primarily as an effective although not rigorous low energy substitute for quantum chromodynamics.

The dynamical creation of a condensate from fermion interactions inspired many theories of the breaking of electroweak symmetry, such as technicolor and the top-quark condensate.

Starting with the one-flavor case first, the Lagrangian density is

The terms proportional to λ are the four-fermion interactions, which parallel the BCS theory.
The global symmetry of the model is U(1)Q×U(1)χ where Q is the ordinary charge of the Dirac fermion and χ is the chiral charge.

There is no bare mass term because of the chiral symmetry. However, there will be a chiral condensate (but no confinement) leading to an effective mass term and a spontaneous symmetry breaking of the chiral symmetry, but not the charge symmetry.

With N flavors and the flavor indices represented by the Latin letters a, b, c, the Lagrangian density becomes

Chiral symmetry forbids a bare mass term, but there may be chiral condensates. The global symmetry here is SU(N)L×SU(N)R× U(1)Q × U(1)χ where SU(N)L×SU(N)R acting upon the left-handed flavors and right-handed flavors respectively is the chiral symmetry (in other words, there is no natural correspondence between the left-handed and the right-handed flavors), U(1)Q is the Dirac charge, which is sometimes called the baryon number and U(1)χ is the axial charge. If a chiral condensate forms, then the chiral symmetry is spontaneously broken into a diagonal subgroup SU(N) since the condensate leads to a pairing of the left-handed and the right-handed flavors. The axial charge is also spontaneously broken.

The broken symmetries lead to massless pseudoscalar bosons which are sometimes called pions. See Goldstone boson.

As mentioned, this model is sometimes used as a phenomenological model of quantum chromodynamics in the chiral limit. However, while it is able to model chiral symmetry breaking and chiral condensates, it does not model confinement. Also, the axial symmetry is broken spontaneously in this model, leading to a massless Goldstone boson unlike QCD, where it is broken anomalously.

Since the Nambu–Jona-Lasinio model is nonrenormalizable in four spacetime dimensions, this theory can only be an effective field theory which needs to be UV completed.

See also
Gross–Neveu model

References

External links 
 Giovanni Jona-Lasinio and Yoichiro Nambu, Nambu-Jona-Lasinio model, Scholarpedia, 5(12):7487, (2010). 	doi:10.4249/scholarpedia.7487

Quantum chromodynamics
Superconductivity